Inferiolabiata is a genus of hydrozoans belonging to the family Stylasteridae.

The species of this genus are found in Southern Hemisphere.

Species:

Inferiolabiata africana 
Inferiolabiata cervicornis 
Inferiolabiata cestospinula 
Inferiolabiata labiata 
Inferiolabiata limatula 
Inferiolabiata lowei 
Inferiolabiata rhabdion 
Inferiolabiata spinosa

References

Stylasteridae
Hydrozoan genera